West Parish may refer to:

In the United Kingdom:
 Holburn West Parish Church, Aberdeen, Scotland

In the United States:
 West Baton Rouge Parish, Louisiana
 West Carroll Parish, Louisiana
 West Feliciana Parish, Louisiana
 West Parish Burying Ground,  Massachusetts
 West Parish Elementary School Science Park, Massachusetts
 West Parish Center District, historic district in Massachusetts